Frederick Bianchi, Duke of Casalanza (1 February 1768 – 18 August 1855), was an Austrian Feldmarschallleutnant who notably served during the Napoleonic Wars.

Early life
Born in Vienna, Bianchi studied at the Imperial Engineering Academy in Vienna. In 1788, serving in the Austro-Turkish War, the sub-lieutenant distinguished himself at the siege of Bubitza. During the French Revolutionary Wars he was appointed captain after the Siege of Valenciennes in 1793. In 1796 he was in Italy as staff officer under Dagobert Sigmund von Wurmser's command. He captured French aide-de-camp Joachim Murat at Brescia. While commanding the six battalions of the Count of Lusignan's regiment at the Battle of Rivoli, he was taken prisoner, but released at the request of General József Alvinczi.

In 1799, as a Lieutenant-Colonel, he was attaché to young Archduke Ferdinand; then to Archduke Charles during the campaign in Germany and Switzerland. He was promoted to colonel in three months, leading the 48th Regiment of Hungarian infantry. In 1804, he put down a revolt at Cattaro, on the Dalmatian coast.

General 
After serving as Adjutant-general of the Army of Germany he again commanded the 48th Regiment until 1807, when he was made Generalmajor.  In 1808 he married Friederike Liebetrau von Maixdorf (1780–1838). Their son Frederick (1812–1865) would eventually become a general as well and likewise rise to the rank of Feldmarschallleutnant.

From 3 to 5 June 1809 he confronted Marshal Louis Nicolas Davout, denying him the bridgehead over the Danube near Pressburg, and was awarded the Knight's Cross of the Military Order of Maria Theresa. He was then made Feldmarschallleutnant (Lieutenant field marshal), with the Infantry Regiment No. 63 as his personal regiment, and inspector of infantry in Hungary. In 1812, after Austria had been forced into a military alliance with France, Bianchi commanded the 1st Division of the Army of Karl Philip of Schwarzenberg; taking part in Napoleon's Russian campaign.

In the German campaign of 1813 he only just kept his division at the Freyburg gate of Dresden, which he had tried to assault until he was attacked by Napoleon. He distinguished himself at the Battle of Leipzig and was afterwards awarded the Cross of St. George by Tsar Alexander I of Russia. In 1814, he commanded an army corps which participated in diverse fighting around Moret-sur-Loing. He was then sent to Dijon to halt Marshal Pierre Augerau's army and was victorious in the smaller Battle of Mâcon on 11 March 1814.

During the Neapolitan War in 1815 he served as a corps commander and was dispatched to southern Italy with a 20,000 strong force to prevent the Joachim Murat, the King of Naples, from conquering Italy. He eventually was made commander of the small army, commanding his own corps and that of Adam Albert von Neipperg. He gained a decisive victory against Murat at the Battle of Tolentino, which earned him the title of Duke of Casalanza from Ferdinand I of the Two Sicilies.

Retirement 
Afterwards he served in the Hofkriegsrat. In 1824 he retired to a relatively private life, moving to an estate in Mogliano Veneto that he had purchased in 1821; there he started vineyards that still bear his name. His presence was unremarkable until 1848, when the revolutions of 1848 in the Habsburg areas made him an enemy representative of the Austrian power, for which he was arrested and imprisoned in Treviso. Two months later the imperial army reconquered the territories and freed Duke Bianchi.

He died at Sauerbrunn near Rogateč, Styria where he had moved temporarily to avoid a cholera epidemic that was ravaging Mogliano; the remains of the body were translated to his villa in 1864.

References

Further reading

Bodart, Gaston (Ed.). Militär-historisches Kriegs-Lexikon (1618–1905). Vienna-Leipzig, 1908, page 406, 477, 485

Neue Deutsche Biographie, Berlin 1953, volume 2, page 214
Oettinger, Edouard-Marie. Moniteur des Dates contenant un million de renseignements biographiques, généalogiques et historiques, Dresden, and Leipzig, volume 1, page 90

Oesterreichisch-Kaiserliche privilegirte Wiener-Zeitung, 25.11.1809, 07.09.1813, 20.02.1814, 30.05.1815, 04.08.1815, 20.02.1816
Österreichischer Militär-Almanach (since 1804:) Schematismus der kaiserlich-königlichen Armee (since 1810:) Schematismus der Oesterreichisch-Kaiserlichen Armee (since 1815:) Militär-*Schematismus des österreichischen Kaiserthums, years 1792-1873 (years 1809 and 1849 not published)
Zivkovic, Georg. Alt-Österreichs Heerführer. Stellenbesetzung in Heer, Landwehr und Kriegsmarine 1541 bis 1918. Vienna 1976, pp. 119, 132-134

External links
A Biographical Dictionary of all Austrian Generals during the French Revolutionary and Napoleonic Wars

1768 births
1855 deaths
Military personnel from Vienna
Austrian lieutenant field marshals
Austrian Empire commanders of the Napoleonic Wars
Commanders Cross of the Military Order of Maria Theresa
Recipients of the Order of St. George of the Third Degree